Japanese football in 1946.

Emperor's Cup

Births
January 21 - Ichiro Hosotani
February 28 - Hiroshi Ochiai
August 21 - Norio Yoshimizu
November 24 - Minoru Kobata
December 26 - Yusuke Omi

Deaths
April 12 - Teizo Takeuchi (aged 37)

External links

 
Seasons in Japanese football